Leonardo Jesus Loureiro Bittencourt (born 19 December 1993) is a German professional footballer who plays as a midfielder for  club Werder Bremen.

Personal life
Bittencourt was born in Leipzig, Germany. He is the son of Franklin Bittencourt, a Brazilian former professional player who played in Germany, and is now active as a coach.

Club career
He began his career with Energie Cottbus. On 1 December 2011, it was announced that Bittencourt had signed a four-year contract with Borussia Dortmund, effective from 1 July 2012. He moved to Hannover 96 at the end of the 2012–13 season.

On 13 July 2015, Bittencourt joined 1. FC Köln on a four-year deal keeping him at the club until 2019.

On 28 April 2018, he played as Köln lost 3–2 to SC Freiburg which confirmed Köln's relegation from the Bundesliga. After the team's relegation, Bittencourt was transferred to TSG 1899 Hoffenheim for a fee of €6 million.

On 2 September 2019, SV Werder Bremen announced the signing of Bittencourt on a season-long loan deal. It was reported the transfer included an obligation for Werder Bremen to sign him permanently for an estimated transfer fee of €7 million. The obligation took effect in July 2020.

International career
Bittencourt has represented Germany's youth teams, under 19 and under 21.

Career statistics

References

1993 births
Living people
Footballers from Leipzig
German people of Brazilian descent
German footballers
Association football midfielders
Germany youth international footballers
Germany under-21 international footballers
FC Energie Cottbus players
FC Energie Cottbus II players
Borussia Dortmund players
Borussia Dortmund II players
Hannover 96 players
TSG 1899 Hoffenheim players
SV Werder Bremen players
Bundesliga players
2. Bundesliga players
3. Liga players